Khuy may refer to:
 Khuy, West Azerbaijan Province, a city in Iran
 Khvan, a village in Iran
 An obscene Russian, Ukrainian and Polish word (chuj)
 Khuy, a controversial song by the Russian punk band Instruktsiya po Vyzhivaniyu, written in 1989
 Khuy, nomarch of Abydos during the reign of Pepi I Meryre in the 24th Century BC.